Bing Crosby Sings Songs by George Gershwin is a compilation album of phonograph records by Bing Crosby released in 1949 featuring songs written by George Gershwin.

Reception
Billboard was enthusiastic:
Crosby singing Gershwin tunes figures to be a winning parlay any time – and this album sounds like a winner, sure enough. Sides were made during recent various years, and it’s nice to be able to report that Croz was in form on each. Every tune here is a 20-carat imperishable, and plenty of earnest affection is lavished on each by Bing and the works of Trotter, Malneck and Victor Young.

Track listing

78rpm album
These previously issued songs were featured in a 4-disc, 78 rpm album set, Decca Album A-702.  All music by George Gershwin.

LP release
The songs were also featured on a 10" LP album, Decca DL 5081 issued in 1949.
Side 1

Side 2

Other releases
In 1950, the same selections were released on a set of 45 rpm records numbered Decca 9-122 and the album cover is shown above.

References

Bing Crosby compilation albums
1949 compilation albums
Decca Records compilation albums